Roger Harris may refer to:
Roger Harris (baseball), American baseball player
Roger Harris (cricketer) (born 1933), former New Zealand cricketer
Roger Harris (politician), former Canadian politician
Sir Roger Harris, 6th Baronet (1601–1685), of the Harris baronets
Sir Robert Harris, 7th Baronet (1612–1693), of the Harris baronets